Jalan Sungai Ayer Tawar (Selangor state route B55) is a major road in Selangor, Malaysia. It is also a main route to Bagan Nakhoda Omar.

List of junctions

Roads in Selangor